The following is a survey of the postage stamps and postal history of Somalia. From the late 1800s to 1960, northwestern present-day Somalia was administered as British Somaliland, while the northeastern, central and southern part of the country were concurrently administered as Italian Somaliland. In 1960, the two territories were unified as the Somali Republic.

Italian Somaliland

Benadir issues
The first stamps of Somalia were issued for the Benadir Company by the Italian authorities in 1903.

Italian colony

In 1905, Italy assumed the responsibility of creating a colony in Somalia, following revelations that the Benadir Company had tolerated or collaborated in the perpetuation of the slave trade.

The first stamps were overprinted on the stamps of Benadir in 1905. Further issues were overprinted on the stamps of Benadir until 1926. From 1916 the stamps of Italy were also overprinted for use in Italian Somaliland. The first set of definitives inscribed "Somalia" was issued in 1930.

Governor Maurizio Rava created the first system of postal service stations in Italian Somaliland, that was fully enlarged in 1937.

Trans-Juba issues

Italian Trans-Juba was established in 1924, after Britain ceded the northern portion of the Jubaland region to Italy.

The first stamps for the new colony were issued on 29 July 1925, consisting of Italian stamps overprinted Oltre Giuba. Trans-Juba was integrated into Italian Somaliland in 1925, .

Italian East Africa

Between 1936 and 1941, stamps were issued for use in Italian East Africa, called in Italian Africa Orientale Italiana (A.O.I.), consisted of Italian Eritrea, Ethiopia and Italian Somaliland.

British administration in Italian Somaliland

After British forces occupied Italian Somaliland during World War II, British stamps overprinted M.E.F. (Middle East Forces) were used. British stamps overprinted "E.A.F." (East Africa Forces) were also used, beginning 15 January 1943.

These were replaced by issues overprinted B.M.A. SOMALIA and later B.A. SOMALIA, reflecting the change from British military to British civil administration. Stamps overprinted in this way were in use from 1948 to 1950.

Trust Territory of Somalia
In 1949, when the British military administration ended, Italian Somaliland became a United Nations trusteeship known as the Trust Territory of Somaliland. Under Italian administration, this trust territory lasted ten years, from 1950 to 1960. Stamps issued during this interval were inscribed in both Italian and Somali.

British Somaliland

Stamps were issued from 1903 to 1960 for the British area, first as British Somaliland, and later as the Somaliland Protectorate.

On 26 June 1960, the British Somaliland protectorate briefly gained independence as the State of Somaliland before uniting as scheduled five days later with the Trust Territory of Somaliland to form the Somali Republic on 1 July 1960. A set of stamps was issued with stamps from Italian Somaliland overprinted "Somaliland Independence 26 June 1960".

Somali Republic
Following the establishment of the Somali Republic, the first stamps of the nascent country were issued on 1 July 1960.

After the 1969 military coup, the country and its stamps were renamed the Somali Democratic Republic.

Traditional postage
In early 1991, the Somali Postal Service had 100 post offices, with a total staff of between 1,665 and 2,165 personnel. The national postal infrastructure was later completely destroyed during the civil war, with Somali Postal officially suspending operations in October 1991. Residents subsequently had to turn to traditional methods of dispatching parcels and letters. They also communicated via handwritten letters sent through acquaintances and mobile and email messaging services.

Postage stamps continued to be produced illegally internationally during the war, although their subject matter suggests they were designed for external collectors.

Somali Postal Service
In November 2013, international postal services officially resumed. The Universal Postal Union is now assisting the reestablished Somali Postal Service to develop its capacity, including providing technical assistance and basic mail processing equipment. In October 2014, the Ministry of Posts and Telecommunications also relaunched postal delivery from abroad. The postal system is slated to be implemented throughout the country via a new postal coding and numbering system. According to the Minister of Posts and Telecommunications Mohamud Ibrihim Adan, the relaunch's next phase will enable local residents to send letters to acquaintances overseas.

See also

Postage stamps and postal history of British Somaliland
Postage stamps and postal history of Italian East Africa
Postage stamps and postal history of Oltre Giuba
Somali Postal Service

References

Further reading
 Bianchi, Paolo. Storia dei servizi postali della Somalia Italiana dalle origini al 1941: con catalogo dei francobolli degli annullamenti = The postal history of Italian Somaliland to 1941, with a catalogue of the cancellations. Vignola: Edizioni Vaccari, 1992 , 302p.
 Circolo Filatelico della Somalia. I francobolli della Somalia emessi dall'Amministrazione Fiduciaria Italiana. Mogadishu: Circolo Filatelico della Somalia, 1955, 24p. 
 Migliavacca, Giorgio. The stamps of Somalia and their story: the first monograph in English entirely devoted to the stamps of a former Italian colony. St. Thomas: Laurel Publications International, 1996, 112p.
 Sirotti, Luigi and Nuccio Taroni. Le Occupazioni Britanniche Delle Colonie Italiane 1941-1950: storia postale = Postal History of the British Occupation of Italian Colonies 1941-1950. Rome: Sassone S.R.L., 2006, 363p.

External links
Bogus stamps of the Somali Republic.

Philately of Italy
Philately of Somalia